Phaeoxantha wimmeri is a brown coloured species of tiger beetle in the subfamily Cicindelinae that was described by Mandl in 1958, and is endemic to Santa Cruz, Bolivia.

References

Beetles described in 1958
Endemic fauna of Bolivia
Beetles of South America